The Master of Letters degree (MLitt or LittM; Latin  or ) is a postgraduate degree.

Ireland 

Trinity College Dublin and Maynooth University offer MLitt degrees.  Trinity has offered them the longest, owing largely to its tradition as Ireland's oldest university and anglican heritage. MLitts are on offer from the School of Law and the School of Humanities.School of Law

United Kingdom 

The Master of Letters degree is a postgraduate degree awarded by a few select British, predominantly within the ancient English and Scottish universities.

England 

Within the English University system MLitt degrees are not offered in all institutions, nor in all disciplines.  An M.Litt. may be awarded as an alternative to the Master of Philosophy research degree and is usually placed higher in the hierarchy; starting with degrees such as the postgraduate Master of Arts (MA) and Master of Science (MSc), then Master of Philosophy, and finally Master of Letters. Note that this varies from the position in Scotland. Students attending English Universities may apply for an MLitt in the first instance; for others who have completed two years of a Doctorate (such as a PhD or DPhil) and who do not wish to, or cannot, continue with the final year(s), there is the option to write up their completed research so far and graduate with an MLitt degree.

Scotland 

The MLitt is awarded within Scottish Universities on its own merit on the basis of a three-year taught,  or four-year research course of postgraduate study rather than as a sub-PhD compensatory alternative as in the English model.

The MLitt is awarded as a three-year taught or distance learning postgraduate degree during which students study six taught components, write essays on those components (or complete assessed coursework) and successfully submit a dissertation (generally between 15,000 and 18,000 words).

The MLitt (Research) may be awarded to a student whose postgraduate course of special study and research represents a significant contribution to knowledge. The period of full-time study is two years and the thesis is normally 40,000-70,000 words.

The  Scottish Universities: University of St Andrews, University of Aberdeen, University of Glasgow, University of Dundee, as well as University of Stirling for example, all award three year MLitt taught or distance learning postgraduate degrees. In addition the University of Aberdeen also awards a one-year MLitt by research.

The University of Edinburgh normally offers the degree of MSc for a one-year taught postgraduate degree and offers either an MLitt or Master of Philosophy over two years by research.

In all cases, the MLitt is usually awarded in Arts, Divinity, Fine Art, Humanities, or Social Sciences.  Sometimes it is taken as a shorter research degree than the MPhil.

Republic of Ireland 
The National University of Ireland offers MLitt degrees across the Human Sciences/Arts. Often students register initially for the MLitt programme before being 'promoted' to PhD studies. Different schools and institutes have different requirements for an MLitt. Generally a number of seminars in the relevant area need to be completed as well as the substantial dissertation researched and written over the period of 4 semesters (6 part-time).

United States 
Most American universities do not award the Master of Letters degree. It is awarded by some schools in the United States. 
 Drew University, in Madison, New Jersey, offers the Master of Letters as an interdisciplinary graduate degree in the Humanities through its "Arts & Letters" programme. The M.Litt. degree requires 30-33 credit hours and the option of submitting a three-credit 50- to 75-page thesis. It is an intermediate degree in the programme, which also offers a Doctor of Letters (D.Litt.) program—the only earned/non-honorary Doctor of Letters degree in the United States.
 Middlebury College offers the degree for the advanced study of English and writing beyond the Master of Arts through its Bread Loaf School of English.
 Mary Baldwin College awards a unique M.Litt. degree requiring two years of study for in-depth research in Shakespeare and Performance, which it offers as an intermediate degree in its three-year MFA program. 
 Omega Graduate School in Tennessee offers an M.Litt. degree in Family Life Education and Organizational Leadership.
 The Davenant Institute offers a 72-credit hour M.Litt. in Classical Protestantism through its Davenant Hall. Its goal is "to retrieve the riches of classical Protestantism in order to renew and build up the contemporary church."

Australia 
The M.Litt. is awarded by two universities in Australia:
 Central Queensland University offer the degree only by distance education through the School of Humanities, Psychology and Social Work, as a 50% coursework, 50% research course, taking two to three years part-time.
 The University of Sydney's M.Litt. is available to students who have previously completed an MA in a relevant discipline. Students can specialise in Creative Writing, English, Theology, History, Linguistics, Museum Studies, or Peace and Conflict Studies.

The Australian National University, Monash University and the University of New England once offered the M.Litt., but have both discontinued the course. Monash, however, retained the Bachelor of Letters as a postgraduate arts degree.

Difference from other Master's degrees 
The main difference that distinguishes a Master of Letters from a Master of Arts is its specific nature. An M.Litt. degree, while requiring similar coursework to an M.A. degree, can be much more specific with its field and coursework. For example, an M.Litt. degree from Mary Baldwin’s Shakespeare & Performance program can qualify an individual to teach English and Theater, since the degree is essentially a hybrid between the two fields. Whereas an MA degree, while still a higher degree, usually only covers a single field without a huge amount of specificity.

References

Education in Scotland
Letters